The Volvo Ocean 65 is a class of monohull racing yachts. It is the successor to the Volvo Open 70 yacht used in past editions of the Volvo Ocean Race. It was announced at a conference in Lorient, France, during a stopover in the 2011–12 Volvo Ocean Race. The yacht was used for the 2014–2015, the 2017–2018 and the 2023 editions. The 2014–2015 Volvo Ocean Race was the first one-design event.

Design
The yacht was designed, by Farr Yacht Design, to be a cheaper and safer alternative to the expensive and fragile Volvo Open 70.

After many safety concerns in the 2011–12 Volvo Ocean Race, many began doubting the safety of the Volvo Open 70, due to many designers opting for fast designs while failing to meet safety requirements. Former Volvo Ocean Race CEO, and four time competitor Knut Frostad hinted at a new boat design to address the current safety concerns in a statement he made during a press conference on April 4, 2012 stating: "It's important that we don't leap to any conclusions about why these breakages have happened. Some of them are clearly not related. However, we will take the current issues into account as we make decisions on rules and technology we will be using in the future." Frostad also went on to say "We have already put in a lot of work, discussing with teams, designers and all other stakeholders about the boats and the rules we will use in the future, and we expect to be in a position to announce a decision on that before the end of the current race."

On June 28, 2012, Knut Frostad revealed the design at a press conference in Lorient during a stopover in the 2011–12 Volvo Ocean Race. In becoming a one-design event, the new boats are hoped to "significantly reduce the cost of mounting a campaign and bring the size of the fleet to 8–10 boats for future editions." Frostad went on to state an entire campaign for future editions of the race would be around €15 million, and a "ready to sail" boat, including pre-race and race sails would be around €4.5 million in comparison to the €30–40 million region a current campaign can fall into.

Construction
It takes 7 months and 36000 man hours to build, assemble, and paint a Volvo Ocean 65. There are 120 boatbuilders who work with 70 suppliers to outfit the boat.

Yachts
There are currently eight Volvo Ocean 65's. They have all been brought to the same standard between the 2014–2015 and the 2017–2018 race at an estimated upgrade cost in the €1 million range.

Changes for 2017–2018 race
The yachts featured a 500W Watt & Sea hydrogenerator to reduce emissions and wear on the Volvo Penta Marine engine.

Partners and equipment

Specifications

Comparison to Volvo Open 70

Reception
After unveiling the boat design, the reception was mostly positive.

Positive
Former competitor and skipper, Grant Dalton stated the new design "attacks the single problem that surrounds our sport at the moment, and that is ridiculous cost."

Negative
The most negative feedback to the announcement of a one-design came from yacht designer Juan Kouyoumdjian whose designs had won the previous three editions of the race (2005–06, 2008–09 and 2011–12). He stated his disapproval of the Volvo Ocean Race becoming a one-design event. Juan addressed the main issue of Volvo Open 70's being expensive stating that he could "definitely confirm" the boats he designed fell into the €5 million range, and that despite trying to make the race more accessible to sponsors and more of a testament to a sailors skill, rather than budget, "the richest will always win." Despite his criticism, he also went on to confirm that in the event that the Volvo Ocean Race became a one-design event, he had already been approached to optimize the Volvo 65 design for a "potential future team."

Further information 
Class Rules and Specifications.

Refit Scope for 2017.

See also
 IMOCA 60

References

Sailing yachts

2010s sailboat type designs